The liver is an organ in animals.

Liver may also refer to:
Liver (album), an album by Steve Taylor
Liver (Chinese medicine)
Liver (color)
Liver (food)
Liver bird, the symbol of the city of Liverpool, England
Liver Music, a collection of songs by the Residents
Liver punch, a boxing move
Liver spot, a blemish on the skin associated with aging and exposure to ultraviolet radiation from the sun
Chopped liver, a liver pâté popular in Ashkenazic cuisine.

See also
 Livre (disambiguation)